Inflexible may refer to:

Stiffness, the rigidity of an object, the extent to which it resists deformation in response to an applied force
Beardmore Inflexible, a British three-engined all-metal prototype bomber aircraft of the 1920s
HMS Inflexible, one of several Royal Navy ships of this name
Inflexible-class ship of the line built for the Royal Navy in the late 16th century
French submarine Inflexible (S615), a French nuclear submarine
LMS Jubilee Class 5727 Inflexible, a steam locomotive constructed in 1936.
ST Inflexible, a French tugboat

See also
Flexibility (disambiguation)